Henricus bleptus is a species of moth of the family Tortricidae. It is found in Ecuador (Pichincha Province, Carchi Province).

The wingspan is about 18.5 mm. The ground colour of the forewings is white, preserved in the posterior half of the wing, with some greyish suffusions. The colour becomes blackish in the dorsal third. The remaining area of the basal half of the wing is blackish grey with black, partially confluent strigulae (fine streaks) and spots. The hindwings are whitish, slightly mixed with grey and with sparse, diffuse broad strigulae.

Etymology
The species name refers to the facies of the species and is derived from Greek bleptos (meaning worth seeing).

References

Moths described in 2007
Henricus (moth)